Busunzu is an administrative ward within Muhambwe Constituency in Kibondo District of Kigoma Region in Tanzania. In 2016 the Tanzania National Bureau of Statistics report there were 26,342 people in the ward, from 23,932 in 2012.

Villages / neighborhoods 
The ward has 2 villages and 19 hamlets.

 Busunzu
 Kabegera
 Kadida
 Kazaroho
 Kolimba
 Mandela
 Mbugani
 Nyamuguruma A
 Nyamuguruma B
 Samora
 Nyakwi
 Karume
 Mandela
 Mtakuja
 Mtuntu
 Nyarulanga
 Nyerere
 Samora
 Sokoine
 Songambele
 Vumilia

References

Kibondo District
Wards of Kigoma Region
Constituencies of Tanzania